John Bell (7 October 1886 – 27 December 1917) was an Australian rules footballer who played with Geelong Football Club in the Victorian Football League (VFL).

Family
The son of John Bell (1855-1906), and Annie Carstairs Bell (1854-1935), née Russell, John Bell was born at Toorak, Victoria on 7 October 1886.

One of his brothers, Lieutenant George Russell Bell (1892-1918), also died on active service in World War One.

Education
He attended Geelong Grammar School from 1896 to 1905.

Football career
Bell played 18 games in all, with Geelong during the 1906 and 1908 seasons.

War service
He enlisted in the First AIF on 2 September 1914, and left Melbourne for overseas service on the HMAT Orvieto (A3) on 21 October 1914.

During World War I, Bell served as a pilot with the Australian Flying Corps. He initially served with No. 1 Squadron AFC, in Palestine.

Bell achieved the rank of Captain. He was later transferred to the Western Front, flying Airco DH.5s with No. 2 Squadron (2 Sqn AFC; sometimes known in British military circles as "68 Squadron").

Death
He was badly wounded ("gunshot wound penetrating his chest": Service Record) and made a forced landing just behind the Allied front line on 20 November 1917, when 2 Squadron was involved in ground attack duties during the First Battle of Cambrai.

Bell died of his wounds on 27 December 1917, and he is buried at Tincourt New British Cemetery in Tincourt-Boucly, Picardy, in Northern France.

Remembered
On 28 April 1931, the Bell family dedicated two stained-glass windows in the chapel of the Geelong Grammar School: the one on the left (holding the football) to John Bell, and the one on the right, to his brother George.

See also
 List of Victorian Football League players who died in active service

Footnotes

References

 Barwon in the Air: Part One — Captain John Bell and the Monkey, barwonrowing.
 Death  of Captain John Bell, The Geelong Advertiser, (Saturday, 5 January 1918), p.4.
 Holmesby, Russell & Main, Jim (2007). The Encyclopedia of AFL Footballers. 7th ed. Melbourne: Bas Publishing.
 Main, J. & Allen, D., "Bell, John", pp. 17–20 in Main, J. & Allen, D., Fallen – The Ultimate Heroes: Footballers Who Never Returned From War, Crown Content, (Melbourne), 2002. 
 World War One Nominal Roll: Captain John Bell, collection of the Australian War Memorial.
 World War One Embarkation Roll: Captain John Bell, collection of the Australian War Memorial.
 Australia's Roll of Honor: 378th and 379th Casualty Lists: Dangerously Wounded, The Age, (Monday, 14 January 1918), p.5.
 Victorian Casualties: List No.383: Died of Wounds, The Argus, (Monday,  16 February 1918), p.9.
 Roll of Honour: Captain John Bell, Australian War Memorial.
 World War One Service Record: Captain John Bell, National Archives of Australia.
 Captain John Bell, Commonwealth War Graves Commission.

External links
 (photograph with Bell at extreme left), collection of the Australian War Memorial.
 
 

1886 births
Australian rules footballers from Victoria (Australia)
Geelong Football Club players
1917 deaths
Australian military personnel killed in World War I
People educated at Geelong Grammar School
Australian Flying Corps officers